Shannon Township may refer to the following places:

In Canada

Shannon Township, Cochrane District, Ontario (geographic / historical)

In the United States

Shannon Township, Atchison County, Kansas
Shannon Township, Pottawatomie County, Kansas
Shannon Township, Robeson County, North Carolina
Shannon Township, Creek County, Oklahoma
Shannon Township, Wagoner County, Oklahoma

See also

Cherry Grove-Shannon Township, Carroll County, Illinois
Shannon (disambiguation)

Township name disambiguation pages